The 2003 FIA GT Championship was the seventh FIA GT Championship. It comprised the FIA GT Championship for Drivers, the N-GT Cup for Drivers, the FIA GT Championship for Teams and the N-GT Cup for Teams. The four titles were contested over a ten event series open to Grand Touring cars broken into two classes, GT and N-GT, based on power and manufacturer involvement. The championship began on 6 April 2003 and ended on 19 October 2003.

Schedule

Entries

GT

N-GT

Season results
Overall winners in bold.

Drivers' Championship

FIA GT Championship for Drivers

The 2003 FIA GT Championship for Drivers was won by Matteo Bobbi & Thomas Biagi driving a Ferrari 550 Maranello for BMS Scuderia Italia.

N-GT Cup for Drivers

The 2003 N-GT Cup for Drivers was won by Marc Lieb & Stéphane Ortelli driving a Porsche 911 GT3-RS for Freisinger Motorsport.

Teams Championship
Points were awarded to the top 8 finishers in the order of 10–8–6–5–4–3–2–1 except at the Spa 24 Hours, where an additional allocation of half points were awarded to the leaders at both the six-hour mark and the twelve-hour mark. Both cars scored points towards the championship regardless of finishing position.

FIA GT Championship for Teams

N-GT Cup for Teams

References

External links
 www.fiagt.com, as archived at web.archive.org on 29 December 2003
 GT and N-GT Drivers' Final Championship Standings, www.fia.com, as archived at web.archive.org
 GT and N-GT Teams' Final Championship Standings, www.fia.com, as archived at web.archive.org
 2003 Race Results - FIA GT Championship, www.teamdan.com, as archived at web.archive.org

FIA GT Championship
FIA GT Championship seasons